The straw-backed tanager (Stilpnia argyrofenges), also known as the green-throated tanager, is a species of bird in the tanager family. It is found in humid highland forests in the Andes of southernmost Ecuador, Peru and Bolivia, but it is generally local and uncommon.

References

straw-backed tanager
Birds of the Peruvian Andes
Birds of the Bolivian Andes
straw-backed tanager
straw-backed tanager
straw-backed tanager
Taxonomy articles created by Polbot
Taxobox binomials not recognized by IUCN